Noah Barker (born 20 August 1992 in Germany) is a Canadian rugby union player. He plays primarily as a prop but can also play hooker. Barker previously played for the Canada under 20s team.

In 2019 Barker signed for the Glendale Raptors team who play in the professional Major League Rugby competition.

References

1992 births
Living people
BC Bears players
Canadian expatriate rugby union players
Canadian expatriate sportspeople in the United States
Expatriate rugby union players in the United States
American Raptors players
People from Courtenay, British Columbia
Rugby union hookers
Rugby union props